The Părău is a left tributary of the river Olt in Romania. It flows into the Olt near the village Părău. The upper reach is also known as Perșani.

References

Rivers of Romania
Rivers of Brașov County